Eystein or Eysteinn is the name of:
Eystein Erlendsson (d. 1188), Norwegian bishop and saint 
Eystein Halfdansson (fl. c. 730), king of Romerike and Vestfold in what is now Norway
Eystein Haraldson (died 1157), king of Norway
Eystein Ivarsson (d. 830) was Jarl of Oplande and Hedmark in Norway
Eystein Magnusson (c.1088–1123), king of Norway
Eystein Meyla (died 1177), also known as Eystein Eysteinson, Norwegian pretender
Eysteinn, legendary Swedish king

See also
 Øystein

Norwegian masculine given names